For dog type lists see:
List of individual dogs
List of Best in Show winners of Crufts
List of Best in Show winners of the Westminster Kennel Club Dog Show
List of Labrador Retrievers
List of oldest dogs
United States presidential pets
List of fictional dogs
List of dog breeds
List of dog fighting breeds
U.S. state dogs

For species in the Family Canidae, colloquially referred to as "dogs", see:
List of canids